Poland competed at the 2011 World Aquatics Championships in Shanghai, China between July 16 and 31, 2011.

Medalists

Diving

Poland has qualified 1 athlete in diving.

Men

Swimming

Men (9): Paweł Korzeniowski, Sławomir Kuczko, Radosław Kawęcki, Konrad Czerniak, Marcin Tarczyński, Mateusz Sawrymowicz, Filip Wypych, Dawid Szulich, Marcin Cieślak

Women (3): Otylia Jędrzejczak, Mirela Olczak, Alicja Tchórz

Men

 * raced in heats only

Women

References

Nations at the 2011 World Aquatics Championships
2011 in Polish sport
Poland at the World Aquatics Championships